Croatia–Poland relations are foreign relations between Croatia and Poland. Both countries are full members of the European Union, NATO, OECD, OSCE, Three Seas Initiative and the Council of Europe.
Poland gave full support to Croatia's membership in the European Union and NATO.

History 
Up until the 20th century, Poland's relations with Croatia was mostly conducted throughout the relations between Poland and various entities ruling Croatia, notably Poland's relations with Austria and Hungary. Poland and Croatia were united by a personal union under the union of Hungary and Poland during the reign of kings Louis I of Hungary in 1370–1382, and Władysław III of Poland in 1440–1444. Poles and Croats fought side by side against the Ottoman invasion of Europe in several battles, including at Nicopolis (1396), Varna (1444) and Mohács (1526).

Poland recognized Croatia on 15 January 1992 along with 16 other, mostly European countries. Diplomatic relations between two countries were established on 11 April 1992.

During the Yugoslav Wars, the Croatian 103rd Infantry Brigade received a small number of Polish volunteers. In 1992–1995, a Polish military contingent was stationed in Croatia as part of the peacekeeping mission of the United Nations Protection Force. Since 2018, a Croatian military contingent has been stationed in Poland as part of the NATO Enhanced Forward Presence defense forces.

April 18, 2010, day of the state funeral of Lech and Maria Kaczyński, was declared a day of national mourning in Croatia to commemorate the 96 victims of the Smolensk air disaster, including Polish President Lech Kaczyński and his wife Maria Kaczyńska.

Poles are an officially recognized national minority of Croatia.

Resident diplomatic missions 

 Croatia has an embassy in Warsaw.
 Poland has an embassy in Zagreb.

Honorary consulates
There are honorary consulates of Croatia in Kraków, Poznań, Bydgoszcz, Białystok and Opole, and an honorary consulate of Poland in Split.

See also 
 Foreign relations of Croatia
 Foreign relations of Poland
 Poland–Yugoslavia relations

References

External links
 Embassy of Croatia in Poland 
 Embassy of Poland in Croatia 

 
Poland
Bilateral relations of Poland